Kaldvågvatnet or Kallvågvatnet is a lake in the municipality of Hamarøy in Nordland county, Norway. The lake Skilvatnet lies immediately east of this lake.

See also
List of lakes in Norway

References

Hamarøy
Lakes of Nordland